Thiha ( born 25 December 1995) is a footballer from Burma, and plays as a midfielder for Yangon United.

References

1995 births
Living people
Burmese footballers
Ayeyawady United F.C. players
Association football midfielders